Henrik Christiansen (born 10 February 1983) is a Norwegian long track speed skater. He represents the club Asker SK.

Personal records

Career highlights

European Allround Championships
2007 - Collalbo, 9th
2008 - Kolomna,  11th
World Cup
2006 - Berlin,  2nd at team pursuit
World Junior Allround Championships
2002 - Collalbo, 23rd
National Championships
2004 - Asker,  3rd at sprint
2007 - Hamar,  3rd at 5000 m
2007 - Geithus,  2nd at allround
European Youth-23 Games
2004 - Göteborg,  2nd at 1500 m

External links
Photos of Henrik Christiansen at Speedskatingphotos by Biseth
Christiansen at Jakub Majerski's Speedskating Database
Christiansen at SkateResults.com

1983 births
Living people
Norwegian male speed skaters
Speed skaters at the 2010 Winter Olympics
Olympic speed skaters of Norway
People from Asker
Sportspeople from Viken (county)
21st-century Norwegian people